State Route 380 (SR 380) is a  state highway that travels west-to-east in a southern arc entirely within Jasper County in the central part of the U.S. state of Georgia. The highway acts as a partial bypass of Monticello.

Route description
SR 380 starts at an intersection with SR 83 (Forsyth Street) southwest of Monticello. Immediately, the route crosses over a Norfolk Southern Railway line and travels to the southeast. The route curves to the south-southeast and back to the southeast. It passes north of Malone Lake before curving to the east and intersecting SR 11 south of the town. Then, SR 380 travels to the northeast to an intersection with SR 212 (Milledgeville–Monticello Road) east-southeast of Monticello. Just past this intersection, SR 380 meets its eastern terminus, an intersection with SR 16 east of town.

SR 380 is not part of the National Highway System, a system of roadways important to the nation's economy, defense, and mobility.

History
The road that would eventually become SR 380 was established in 1983 along the current routing of SR 380, although it was designated as SR 83 Connector. By January 1986, the entire highway was redesignated as SR 380.

Major intersections

See also

References

External links

 Georgia Roads (Routes 361 - 380)

380
Transportation in Jasper County, Georgia